Sa Re Ga Ma Pa is a Bengali language singing reality show which airs on Zee Bangla. At very beginning it was hosted by actor Jisshu Sengupta from 2012 to 2019. The show is currently hosted by Abir Chatterjee from 2020 to present.

Hosts

Seasons

Grand master 
From its 20th season, the Grand master was introduced. Ajoy Chakrabarty became the grand master in 2022.

Mentors
Since its 17th season mentors are there in this show.

References

Sa Re Ga Ma Pa
Indian reality television series
Zee Bangla original programming